Mount Send is a mountain (1,180 m) on the north flank of Pryor Glacier, 10 nautical miles (18 km) east of Basilica Peak, in southern Wilson Hills. Mapped by United States Geological Survey (USGS) from surveys and U.S. Navy air photos, 1960–62. Named by Advisory Committee on Antarctic Names (US-ACAN) for Raymond F. Send, United States Antarctic Research Program (USARP) geophysicist at McMurdo Station, 1967–68.

Mountains of Oates Land